Brucepattersonius misionensis, also known as the Misiones akodont or Misiones brucie, is a rodent species from South America in the genus Brucepattersonius. It is known from a single individual collected in Misiones Province in northeastern Argentina. Its taxonomic status remains to be determined conclusively. It is threatened by habitat loss and is not known from any protected areas.

References

Literature cited
 
 Duff, A. and Lawson, A. 2004. Mammals of the World: A checklist. New Haven, Connecticut: Yale University Press, 312 pp. 
 

Brucepattersonius
Mammals of Argentina
Mammals described in 2000